Hariyali Aur Rasta (English: The Greenery and the Road) is a 1962 Hindi film produced and directed by Vijay Bhatt. It stars Manoj Kumar and Mala Sinha in lead roles. The film has music by Shankar Jaikishan.

The film was the fourth highest grosser of the year and declared a 'Hit'.

Plot
Hariyali Aur Rasta is a triangular love story between Shankar (Manoj Kumar), Shobhana (Mala Sinha), and Rita (Shashikala). The marriage of Rita and Sankar was arranged in their childhood, though when they grow up, Shankar falls in love with Shobhana, though he eventually ends up marrying Rita, as per their family's desires. They both cannot reconcile to the ill-fitting marriage, and the situation deteriorates further when ex-flame Shobhana comes into their lives once again.

Cast
 Manoj Kumar as Shanker
 Mala Sinha as Shobna / Kamla
 Shashikala as  Rita
 Om Prakash as Joseph
 Helen as- Dancer Dolly
Manmohan Krishna as Shivnath
Surendra

Production and crew
The film was shot extensively in Darjeeling, especially in the Ging Tea and Rangeet Tea Estates.

 Production: Gamanlal Bhatt
 Assistant Director: Arun Bhatt, Haren Ghosh
 Art Direction: Shri Krishna Achrekar, Kanu Desai
 Choreography: Satyanarayan
 Costume: Gaffar Behl

Soundtrack 
The soundtrack includes the following tracks composed by Shankar Jaikishan, and with lyrics by Shailendra and Hasrat Jaipuri, together they created songs such as "Ibteda-e-Ishk Mein Hum Saari Raat Jaage", Allah Jaane Kya Hoga Aage" sung by Mukesh and Lata, plus a perennial Diwali hit; "Lakhon Taare Aasman Mein Ek Magar Dhunde Na Mila", "Dekh Ke Duniya Ki Diwali Dil Mera Chup Chap Jala" again by Lata and Mukesh.

References

External links
 

1962 films
1960s Hindi-language films
Indian black-and-white films
Films scored by Shankar–Jaikishan
Films directed by Vijay Bhatt